Batubara Regency is a regency on North Sumatra's eastern shoreline, with Limapuluh as its seat. It was carved out from the seven most westerly coastal districts of Asahan Regency with effect from 15 June 2007. The new regency covers an area of 904.95 km2, and had a population of 375,885 at the 2010 Census and 410,678 at the 2020 Census, of whom 206,551 were male and 204,127 were female.

Administrative districts 
From 2007 until 2017 the regency was divided administratively into seven districts (kecamatan), but at the end of 2017 five additional districts were created by the division of four of the existing districts. The districts are tabulated below from east to west with their areas and their populations at the 2010 Census and the 2020 Census. The table also includes the locations of the district administrative centres, the number of administrative villages (desa and kelurahan) in each district and its post code:

Note: (a) includes small offshore islands of Pandang and Salahnama. (b) the 2010 population of the new Nibung Hangus District is included with the figure for Tanjung Tiram District, from which it was cut out. (c) the 2010 population of the new Datuk Tanah Datar District is included with the figure for Talawi District, from which it was cut out. (d) the 2010 population of the new Lima Puluh Pesisir and Datuk Lima Puluh Districts are included with the figure for Lima Puluh District, from which they were cut out. (e) the 2010 population of the new Laut Tador District is included with the figure for Sei Suka District, from which it was cut out.

Transport
On 27 January 2015 groundbreaking for the new Kuala Tanjung Port began. The port will accommodate 60 million TEUs (twenty-foot equivalent units) per year as the biggest port in West Indonesia, bigger than Tanjung Priok Port, in Jakarta with only 15 million TEUs per year.

References

Regencies of North Sumatra
2007 establishments in Indonesia